Ramal de Matosinhos, originally called Ramal de Leixões, was a metre-gauge railway line which connected the stations of Senhora da Hora, on the Linha do Porto à Póvoa e Famalicão, to the Port of Leixões, in Portugal. It was built in 1884 to connect the port to the São Gens quarry. Later, it was adapted to passenger and freight transport. Commercial service began on the 6 May 1893. The line was closed on 1 July 1965. In the 2000s, part of the trackbed was used for the construction of Porto Metro Line A.

See also
List of railway lines in Portugal
List of Portuguese locomotives and railcars
History of rail transport in Portugal

References

Railway lines in Portugal
Railway lines opened in 1884
1884 establishments in Portugal
Railway lines closed in 1965
1965 disestablishments in Portugal